Thomas Edward Brodie Sopwith (15 November 1932 – 4 May 2019) was a British businessman and car racing driver.

Biography
Thomas Sopwith was the son of English aviation pioneer and yachtsman Sir Thomas Sopwith – builder of the Sopwith Camel and later chairman of Hawker Aircraft – and Phyllis Brodie. He was educated at Stowe School, Buckinghamshire.

Sopwith took up motor racing and formed his own team, Equipe Endeavour, named after his father's racing yacht. His success as a racing driver saw him win the first-ever round of the British Saloon Car Championship in 1958. That year he narrowly lost out on the driver's title to Jack Sears after a ten lap shoot-out at the end of the season, after the two drivers finished on equal points. In 1961 he switched from car to powerboat racing. In 1961 He won the first ever Cowes - Torquay race in Thundebolt, following up with wins in 1968 (Telstar) and 1970 (Miss Enfield II). In 1965 he won the Cornish "100" Offshore Class 3, powerboat race in a boat called 'Thunderflash', just beating Mike Beard in 'Mongaso'.

He was the owner of Endeavour Holdings Limited, a car dealership in Portslade, Brighton, with a turnover of £17 million.

He died on 4 May 2019 at the age of 86 at Basingstoke Hospital.

Racing record

Complete British Saloon Car Championship results
(key) (Races in bold indicate pole position; races in italics indicate fastest lap.)

† Events with 2 races staged for the different classes.

‡ Event with 3 races staged for the different classes.

References

English racing drivers
British Touring Car Championship drivers
People educated at Stowe School
1932 births
2019 deaths